Sandeep Sangha (born 1987) is an Indian professional football player, currently playing for Mohammedan S.C. in the I-League as a defender.

Career

Mohammedan
After spending one year with ONGC F.C., on 31 May 2013 it was confirmed that Sangha has signed with Mohammedan on a one-year contract along with Collin Abranches.
He made his professional debut in the I-League on 21 September 2013 against Pune at the Salt Lake Stadium and played the entire match, as Mohammedan lost the match 1–3.

Career statistics

Club

References

External links
http://www.goal.com/en-india/people/india/43523/sandeep-sangha
http://www.srb.worldfootball.net/ugc/sandeep-sangha/

Indian footballers
1987 births
Living people
Footballers from Punjab, India
ONGC FC players
Air India FC players
Mohammedan SC (Kolkata) players
Association football midfielders